Robert Riccaltoun (1691-1769) was a minister in the Church of Scotland at Hobkirk, Roxburghshire. Robert was one of the leading figures of the Marrow Brethren, Robert was known for "correcting misinterpretations of the Marrow of Modern Divinity given by its opponents", Robert Riccaltoun was a critic of James Hadow.

Personal life 
Robert Riccaltoun was born in 1691 at Earlshaugh, his father was a farmer but Robert was educated at Edinburgh University. Robert was Ordained in 1725, remaining a minister for his whole life.

References 

Scottish Calvinist and Reformed theologians
18th-century Scottish writers
18th-century Presbyterian ministers